Rudolph A. LaRusso (November 11, 1937 – July 9, 2004) was an American professional basketball player who was a five-time All-Star in the National Basketball Association (NBA).  He was nicknamed "Roughhouse Rudy."

Early life
LaRusso was Jewish, and was born in Brooklyn, New York.  He attended James Madison High School in Brooklyn. LaRusso, whose mother was Jewish and father was Italian, won All-City honors and was later inducted into the New York City Basketball Hall of Fame. He attended and graduated from Dartmouth College.  In 1959, playing for Dartmouth, he grabbed 32 rebounds in a game against Columbia, tying an Ivy League record. He also set Dartmouth records for rebounds in a season (503) and career (1,239), and was twice named All-Ivy League.

Professional career

Minneapolis/Los Angeles Lakers (1960–1967)
He was taken by the Minneapolis Lakers in the second round of the 1959 NBA draft out of Dartmouth College, and played eight years with them and two for the San Francisco Warriors. On November 26, 1959, he scored 15 points and 20 rebounds in a 95-114 loss to the Cincinnati Royals. He became the second Lakers rookie to have grabbed at least 20 rebounds in a single game, joining teammate Elgin Baylor. On February 24, 1960, he scored a season-high 27 points in a 110-131 loss to the Boston Celtics.

In his second year, LaRusso slightly improved his statistics from his rookie season. In his second game of the season, LaRusso recorded a career-high 28 points in a 96-112 loss to the St. Louis Hawks.

In 1962, he scored 50 points, at that point the most ever by a Jewish NBA basketball player, in a game for the Lakers against the St. Louis Hawks. In 1967–68, he finished seventh in the league with a career-best average of 21.8 ppg.

San Francisco Warriors (1968–1969)

Player profile
He was a five-time All-Star and was known for his rebounding, tight defense, toughness, and presence.

Personal life
LaRusso had a small cameo role in the Gilligan's Island third-season episode "Bang! Bang! Bang!" as 'Agent Michaels'.

He died of Parkinson's disease in 2004. He has a son, Corey LaRusso, and a daughter from another marriage, Christine Larusso, a Los Angeles-based poet.

NBA career statistics

Regular season

|-
| style="text-align:left;"| 
| style="text-align:left;"| Minneapolis Lakers
| 71 || - || 29.5 || .389 || - || .742 || 9.6 || 1.2 || - || - || 13.7
|-
| style="text-align:left;"| 
| style="text-align:left;"| L.A. Lakers
| 79 || - || 32.8 || .419 || - || .790 || 9.9 || 1.7 || - || - || 14.6
|-
| style="text-align:left;"| 
| style="text-align:left;"| L.A. Lakers
| 80 || - || 34.4 || .466 || - || .763 || 10.4 || 2.2 || - || - || 17.2
|-
| style="text-align:left;"|
| style="text-align:left;"| L.A. Lakers
| 75 || - || 33.4 || .422 || - || .718 || 10.0 || 2.5 || - || - || 12.3
|-
| style="text-align:left;"|
| style="text-align:left;"| L.A. Lakers
| 79 || - || 34.8 || .434 || - || .751 || 10.1 || 2.4 || - || - || 12.3
|-
| style="text-align:left;"|
| style="text-align:left;"| L.A. Lakers
| 77 || - || 33.6 || .461 || - || .773 || 9.4 || 2.6 || - || - || 14.1
|-
| style="text-align:left;"|
| style="text-align:left;"| L.A. Lakers
| 76 || - || 30.5 || .457 || - || .787 || 8.7 || 2.2 || - || - || 15.4
|-
| style="text-align:left;"|
| style="text-align:left;"| L.A. Lakers
| 45 || - || 28.7 || .415 || - || .696 || 7.8 || 1.7 || - || - || 12.8
|-
| style="text-align:left;"|
| style="text-align:left;"| San Francisco Warriors
| 79 || - || 35.7 || .433 || - || .790 || 9.4 || 2.3 || - || - || 21.8
|-
| style="text-align:left;"|
| style="text-align:left;"| San Francisco Warriors
| 75 || - || 37.1 || .410 || - || .794 || 8.3 || 2.1 || - || - || 20.7
|- class="sortbottom"
| style="text-align:center;" colspan="2"| Career
| 736 || - || 33.3 || .431 || - || .767 || 9.4 || 2.1 || - || - || 15.6

See also
List of select Jewish basketball players

References

External links

1937 births
2004 deaths
American men's basketball players
Basketball players from New York City
Centers (basketball)
Dartmouth Big Green men's basketball players
Neurological disease deaths in California
Deaths from Parkinson's disease
James Madison High School (Brooklyn) alumni
Jewish American sportspeople
Jewish men's basketball players
Los Angeles Lakers players
Minneapolis Lakers draft picks
Minneapolis Lakers players
National Basketball Association All-Stars
Power forwards (basketball)
San Francisco Warriors players
Sportspeople from Brooklyn
20th-century American Jews
21st-century American Jews